Yangge is a form of Chinese folk dance developed from a dance known in the Song dynasty as Village Music. It is very popular in northern China and is one of the most representative form of folk arts. It is popular in both the countryside and cities in northern China. It is especially popular among older people. Crowds of people will go out into the street in the evening and dance together in a line or a circle formation.

Some dancers dress up in red, green, or other colorful costumes, and typically use a red silk ribbon around the waist. They will swing their bodies to music played by drum, trumpet, and gong. More people will join in as they see Yang Ge going on and dance along. Some dancers use props like the waistdrum, dancing fan, fake donkey, or litter. In different areas Yangge is performed in different styles, but all types express happiness.

In the 1940s, the Chinese Communist Party launched the new yangge movement where the dance was adopted as a means of rallying village support.  The dance was simplified into a pattern of three-quick-steps forward, one-step-backward, pause and repeat.  This version of the dance incorporated socialist elements, for example the leader of the dance group would hold a sickle instead of umbrella, and it is also known as "Struggle Yangge" or "reform yangge".

Struggle (Reform) Yangge and the Chinese Communist Party 

The new struggle yangge had roots in the traditional folk rite yangge that was performed in the rural parts of Northern China prior to the Japanese invasion of 1937. The folk rite was performative and was often associated with New Year’s celebrations, incorporating spirited dance, garish costumes, and loud music. The dance troupe was led by a leader dancer known as santou (umbrella head) and consisted of dancers, ranging from a few dozen to more than one hundred dancers. Simple plays were enacted during the dance, mostly about everyday life in rural China. The songs that accompanied the folk rite were conversations between young men and women about love or congratulatory greetings, and the swinging movements of the dances were generally sexually suggestive.

The struggle yangge that was popularized by the Chinese Communist Party (CCP) in urban settings from 1949 to 1951 was a political instrument used to communicate the socialist ideals of the CCP to the people. In fact, the dance limited artistic freedom and improvisation with specific guidelines that the dance must adhere to including: prohibition of male performers to dress as women; elimination of any flirtatious or erotic moves; forbiddened the portrayal of ghosts, deities, Buddhist monks, and Daoist priests (elements that were common in rural yangge); no vulgarity or negative portrayals of the working class in the dances, and dancers were not permitted to wear excessive makeup. The power of the struggle yangge came from the dance’s simplicity and visibility, aimed at reaching a larger and wider audience. Unlike rural yangge with its complex and vast dance patterns, struggle yangge utilized simpler dance moves such as Double Cabbage Heart (spiraling move) and Dragon Waves Its Tail (snakelike movement) to, as one yangge dancer puts it, “to express an exuberant mood and to invite as many people as possible to share in the joy”.

Struggle yangge’s purpose was to tell a story about the success of the CCP developments, of how the Communists came to power, about the valor and strength of the People’s Liberation Army, the undying support of the Chinese people, the righteous leadership of the CCP, and the bright socialist future of China. The story was told in three musical performances, consisting of song and dance, with the production of these performances in chronological order to achieve maximum impact. The first was The Great Yangge of the Celebration of Liberation (庆祝解放大秧歌), which told the war of liberation from the Nationalists. The second piece was The Great Musical of Long Live the People’s Victory (人民胜利万岁大歌舞), which illustrated the remembrance of the people’s victory in the revolution. The last musical was The Great Yangge of Building the Motherland (建设祖国大秧歌), which depicts the construction of a new socialist country under the leadership of the CCP. The production of each performance was elaborate and complex, with shows lasting four to five hours.

Types
There are two major types of yangge, one is Stilt Yangge which is performed on stilts, the other is Ground Yangge which is more common and is performed without stilts.   Another version of the yangge is the village play, an anthology of which was published by Sidney D. Gamble in 1970, based on transcriptions made by Li Jinghan as part of the Ding Xian Experiment's surveys in the 1930s.

The Yangge drama or Yangge opera usually consists of a quatrain of seven stanzas or long and short sentences. An example is the founding piece of the China National Opera when it was founded in Yan'an in 1942, which was with a performance of a Yangge drama  Brothers and Sisters Opening up the Wasteland. The Yangko owed something to normal huaju spoken drama, but with dance, and songs added.

Regional variations

North Shaanxi
The dance may be in large groups of a dozen to a hundred people, or in two or three-person groups. The dancers move from location to location, visiting different parts of the town. The leader of the procession of dancers is called the santou or "Umbrella" who wields an umbrella to lead the movement of the group.  He also sings, usually improvised, while the others will repeat his last line.  Various characters may appear in the procession, such as the two comic characters Big-Headed Monk and Liu Cui, and the Eight Immortals.  The procession first follows the santou in a single file to form a large simple circle, and later then forms other more intricate patterns.

Shandong
The Shandong yangge is thought to be the purest forms of yangge.  There are three major types of yangge in the Shandong province, the Haiyang yangge, Jiaozhou yangge, and the guzi ( "drum") yangge. In guzi yangge each dancer takes one of five roles - "Umbrella", "Drum", "Stick", "Flower", "Clown" - the first three are named after the props the dancer holds, while the fourth refers to a female dancer.

Liaoning
In Liaoning and Beijing, a popular form is the stilt yangge where the dancers perform on stilts. There are many types of stilt yangge, for example "Jietang" is a group dance performed in the street; "Jiaxiang" involves the formation of a pyramid of different poses; "Dachang" is  group dance done in a large open air space; and "Xiaochang" characterized by its love-story plot.

Northeast China
The performers of Manchurian Yangge in Northeast China usually wear traditional Manchu clothes of the area.  The movement is free and brisk, imitating the valor of a tribe excelling in horsemanship and marksmanship.

See also
Dance of China
List of ethnic, regional, and folk dances sorted by origin
Pungmul & Samul nori of the ethnic Koreans in China
Square dancing (China)

References

External links
Yangge
"Rice Sprout Songs," (Princeton University History 325) 
A yangge dance procession in Shaanxi

Syllabus-free dance
Dances of China
Chinese folk music